1970 Love Story is an upcoming Sri Lankan Sinhalese romantic thriller film directed by Aruna Jayawardana and produced by Saman Edirisinghe for Star Entertainments and Events. It stars Hemal Ranasinghe and Gamya Wijayadasa in lead roles along with Mahendra Perera, Bimal Jayakody and Sarath Kothalawala in supportive roles.

The film based on real events of an incidence occurred in 1970.

Plot

Cast
 Hemal Ranasinghe		
 Gamya Wijayadasa		
 Mahendra Perera		
 Ashan Dias		
 Bimal Jayakody		
 Dineth De Silva		
 Sarath Kothalawala		
 Sandani Fernando
 Suneth Malsiripura		
 Nishantha Priyadarshana		
 Nandana Hettiarachchi		
 Asanga Perera		
 Daya Wayaman		
 Saman Hemarathna		
 Lasantha Udukumbura

References

External links
 
 1970 Love Story on Facebook

Sinhala-language films